Tranquillo Barnetta (born 22 May 1985) is a Swiss former professional footballer who played as a midfielder.

He was usually deployed out wide as a left winger but could also play in the centre as an attacking midfielder, or even in a more withdrawn role as a central midfielder. Barnetta was known for his "extreme pace, mobility and creativity". Prior to moving to MLS, Barnetta played football for several Swiss and German clubs. At international level, he has amassed 75 caps for the Swiss national team, representing his nation in three FIFA World Cups, and two UEFA European Football Championships.

Playing career

Club

St. Gallen
Barnetta started his career with his hometown team, St. Gallen for the 2002–2003 season. During his first professional season, he earned 30 appearances and scored 5 goals.

Bayer Leverkusen
Barnetta's debut season in Switzerland was noticed abroad and was soon snapped up by German side Bayer Leverkusen in January 2004.
During his first season at Bayer, he had a loan spell at Hannover 96, returning to Bayer in March 2005.

After a good showing at the World Cup in Germany, Barnetta became a regular in the Bayer squad. The 2008–09 season was one to forget for him, after Bayer finished two places lower than the previous season and his goals tally dropped slightly. During the summer transfer window, he was linked with a move away from Bayer as his place in the squad seemed under threat from loanee Toni Kroos. Barnetta regained his good form in the 2009–10 season, scoring a brace in only his second league game of the season and contributing to Bayer's unbeaten run for the entire first half of the season.

Schalke 04/Eintracht Frankfurt
On 2 July 2012, after his contract ran out at Bayer Leverkusen, Schalke 04 confirmed that Barnetta signed a three-year professional contract with them until 30 June 2015, and in preparation for the Gelsenkirchen club's participation in the Champions League. The transfer was reported as a free transfer by Schalke's sport and communications manager Horst Heldt. Barnetta was assigned a number 27 shirt, previously worn by Ciprian Deac. In the 2013–14 season, Barnetta had a season long loan spell at Eintracht Frankfurt, returning to Schalke 04 in June 2014 whom he signed for at the end of the 2011–12 season.

On 23 September 2014, Barnetta scored his first goal for Schalke in his second league match of the 2014–15 season.

Philadelphia Union
On 29 July 2015, Barnetta signed with the Philadelphia Union. Integrating with the Union, who were midway through their season, Barnetta netted his first goal on 20 September, in a home win against the Houston Dynamo.

After a full preseason with the Union, Barnetta led the team as the attacking playmaker during the 2016 season. Registering 5 goals and 4 assists, he helped lead Philadelphia's return to the MLS Cup Playoffs for the first time since 2011. Prior to the conclusion of the 2016 campaign, the Union announced Barnetta would return to Switzerland to rejoin FC St. Gallen. Barnetta cited he wanted to contribute to his hometown club in front of friends and family while he still had the fitness to do so meaningfully. He finished his Philadelphia career with 45 appearances and 6 goals.

Return to St. Gallen
Barnetta signed a contract with St. Gallen on 14 November 2016, starting from 1 January 2017.

At the end of the 2018–19 season, Barnetta decided to retire.

International

Barnetta is a former youth international and was in the Swiss U-17 squad that won the 2002 U-17 European Championships along with future senior teammates Philippe Senderos and Reto Ziegler. He has been a member of the senior national team and was first called up to the squad for the Euro 2004 but did not make an appearance. Barnetta was called up to the squad after Johann Lonfat was injured and Davide Chiumiento had turned down a call up as the first choice replacement. At the 2006 World Cup, he scored the second goal in Switzerland's group stage win over Togo, but missed a penalty kick in the shootout against Ukraine, which Switzerland lost 3–0. On 4 July, Barnetta was shortlisted for the tournament's Best Young Player award. He was ever present in 2010 World Cup qualifying as the Swiss secured a place by finishing top of their group. On 4 June 2011, Barnetta scored two free kicks in quick succession against England in the Euro 2012 qualifiers. Barnetta was called up to represent Switzerland at the 2014 FIFA World Cup in Brazil, but he didn't play any matches.

Playing style
Known for his "extreme pace, mobility and creativity" on the left flank, FIFA's official website describes Barnetta as a "primarily a creative footballer", who also "covers ground and closes down opponents on the football pitch with the sort tireless energy and dogged determination one might expect from a tigerish central midfielder". Barnetta is regarded for bringing "drive, skill and maturity" to the Swiss national team.

Personal life
Barnetta was born in St. Gallen. Both his parents are of Italian descent and he holds both  Swiss and Italian citizenship.

Career statistics

Club

International
Source:

International goals

References

External links

  
 barnettafan.ch – Tranquillo Barnetta's official fanshop 
 

1985 births
Living people
Sportspeople from St. Gallen (city)
Swiss people of Italian descent
Association football midfielders
Swiss men's footballers
Swiss expatriate footballers
FC St. Gallen players
Hannover 96 players
Bayer 04 Leverkusen players
FC Schalke 04 players
Eintracht Frankfurt players
Philadelphia Union players
Expatriate footballers in Germany
Expatriate soccer players in the United States
UEFA Euro 2004 players
2006 FIFA World Cup players
2010 FIFA World Cup players
2014 FIFA World Cup players
UEFA Euro 2008 players
Switzerland international footballers
Switzerland youth international footballers
Swiss Super League players
Bundesliga players
Major League Soccer players
Swiss expatriate sportspeople in Germany
Swiss expatriate sportspeople in the United States